Lake Leksozero is a large freshwater lake in the Republic of Karelia, Russia. It has an area of 166 km² and an average depth of 8.6 m. It freezes up in November and stays icebound until May. There are many islands on the lake. Leksozero is used for fishery. The lake drains through the river Lieksanjoki that flows into the lake Pielinen in Northern Karelia, Finland. These lakes are part of the Vuoksi River basin in Finland and Russia, which in turn is part of the Neva River basin in Russia.

References
Water resources of Republic of Karelia and their use for drinking water supply. Petrozavodsk – Kuopio 2006. Page 69.

LLeksozero
Leksozero